The mayor of Philadelphia is the chief executive of the government of Philadelphia, Pennsylvania,
as stipulated by the Charter of the City of Philadelphia. The current mayor of Philadelphia is Jim Kenney.

History
The first mayor of Philadelphia, Humphrey Morrey, was appointed by the city's founder, William Penn. Subsequently, Penn appointed Edward Shippen as the first mayor under the charter of 1701 (second mayor overall). The Philadelphia City Council then elected Shippen to a second term. Subsequent mayors, who held office for one year, were elected by the city council from among their number.

No monetary compensation was paid to the earliest office-holders, and candidates often objected strongly to their being selected, sometimes choosing even to pay a fine rather than serve. In 1704 Alderman Griffith Jones was elected but declined to serve, for which he was fined twenty pounds. In 1706, Alderman Thomas Story was similarly fined for refusing office. In 1745, Alderman Abraham Taylor was fined thirty pounds for refusing the mayoralty; Council then elected Joseph Turner, who also refused and was likewise fined. Others who refused election included Richard Hill (1717), Isaac Norris (1722), John Mifflin, and Alexander Stedman, while William Coxe pleaded illness (1758), Samuel Mifflin (1761), William Coxe and Daniel Benezet (1762), and John Barclay and George Roberts (1792). Robert Wharton declined in 1800 and 1811, amid serving for 14 one-year terms, making him the most-often-elected (16 times, including refusals) and longest-serving (14 years) mayor of Philadelphia.

In 1747, at the request of retiring Mayor William Attwood, Council resolved to institute an annual salary of 100 pounds for the office. Nevertheless, that same year, Anthony Morris secretly fled to Bucks County to avoid being notified of his election to the mayoralty. When he could not be located after three days, a new election had to be arranged, and Attwood was re-elected to a second term.

Beginning in 1826, Council could elect any citizen of Philadelphia to the mayoralty. From 1839, mayors were elected by popular vote. If no candidate won a majority of the popular vote, then the joint Councils (Select and Common) would decide between the two leading candidates. John Swift was the first mayor to be elected directly by the people in the 1840 election.

The term of office was extended to two years in 1854, three years in 1861, and four years in 1885. Further, The Act of 1885 prohibited mayors from succeeding themselves. The restriction was lifted in the 1940s allowing Bernard Samuel to run for re-election. In 1951, the city's Home Rule Charter established a two-term limit for mayors. The term limit is consecutive, not lifetime.

The mayorship of Philadelphia has been held by Democrats since 1952, with the only Republican in recent memory coming close to winning the position being Sam Katz, who in 1999 was less than half a percentage point away from being the first Republican mayor of Philadelphia elected in over 45 years.

List of Mayors 
 Parties

Colonial mayors elected by the Common Council

Post-independence mayors elected by the common council

Mayors chosen by popular election

Mayors elected following the Act of Consolidation

Mayors elected under the Home Rule Charter of 1951

See also

  History of Philadelphia  
Timeline of Philadelphia

Notes

References

Sources

Books

Websites
  Official Philadelphia Government list

External links

Office of the Mayor

Mayors
1691 establishments in Pennsylvania